Thermotoga lettingae is a thermophilic, anaerobic, non-spore-forming, motile and Gram-negative bacterium, with type strain TMOT.

References

Further reading
Dworkin, Martin, and Stanley Falkow, eds. The Prokaryotes: Vol. 7: Proteobacteria: Delta and Epsilon Subclasses. Deeply Rooting Bacteria. Vol. 7. Springer, 2006.

External links

LPSN

Thermophiles
Thermotogota
Bacteria described in 2002